Eyre Lacuna is a feature on Saturn's largest moon, Titan, believed to be a currently dry bed of an intermittent hydrocarbon lake.

When full, the lake would be composed of liquid methane and ethane. It was detected in 2007 by the Cassini–Huygens space probe.

Eyre Lacuna is located at coordinates 72.6°N and 225.1°W on Titan's globe and is 25.4 km in diameter. It is named after Lake Eyre, an intermittent lake in Australia.

References

Lakes of Titan (moon)